Shibganj is an upazila of Nawabganj District in the Division of Rajshahi, Bangladesh.

History

Shibganj has a few well-known places with Hindu heritage, Kanshat town, and Kansat Bazar. Most of the wealthy Hindus left East Pakistan for India after Partition of India in 1947. One of Hindu families used to live by the side of the Shahanbandha lake or pookoor and the origin of village's name Pukhuria. The Hindu family was known as Ghosh family.
Ghosh family had a manor by the side of the lake and surrounded on three sides by mango, coconut and date palm trees. This manor had an entrance with Ashoka trees. Ghosh family lived there for hundreds of years. Ramesh Chandra Ghosh was born there and studied at Malda Zilla School and Calcutta University and became a lawyer, after having MA LLB. He practiced law at Chapai Nawabganj of Malda District and later at Malda town. He was a politician and imprisoned by British colonial government of India during independence movements of the 1940s. He was a political colleague of Netaji Subhas Chandra Bose.
Ramesh Chandra Ghosh married Shoilobala Sen of Coochbehar. The family of Shoilobala Sen was a friend of the then Maharaja of Cooch Behar. They had 4 sons and 2 daughters. Their eldest daughter was the first female who graduated (BA) from Calcutta University in that area. One son became principal of a college at Howrah near Kolkata, two sons became physician graduating from Kolkata NRS Medical College (formerly known as Campbell Medical College), and another became Chief Architect of Calcutta and had a postgraduate qualification from the United States. One of their physician sons went to UK and married an English lady and settled there and worked in UK National Health Service and had several achievements. He is mentioned in "Who's Who Indians in Britain."

Eldest daughter Manorama after graduating from Calcutta University was appointed Headmistress (Head Teacher) of Nawabganj Girls' High School and stayed there till the beginning of 1952.
Four sons of Ramesh Chandra Ghosh were students of Nawabganj 'Harimohan High School' and passed Matriculation Examination with Scholarships and other achievements.
Now the Ghosh family is spread to 4 continents of the world. There is a book being published in London about Pukhuria Village and Ghosh family and the offspring- "Once upon a time in a place in India". This book is about history of Pukhuria of last several hundred years and the Ghosh family. The book is compiled by Mailika Klaus, Grand Daughter-in-Law of Ramesh Chandra Ghosh and Soilobala Ghosh, who is European of Estonian origin and multilingual.
One of the Grandsons of Ramesh Chandra Ghosh, Robin, is a Barrister in London and get mentioned in NewsPaper of London in his success in High Court/Crown Court cases. Other Grand children are high achievers in England, US, and Australia besides in India.

Geography

It has 67,009 households and a total area of 525.43 km2.

There is a land port and border checkpoint on the Bangladesh-India border at Sonamosjid

Shibganj Upazila is bounded by Bholahat Upazila and English Bazar CD Block in Malda district, West Bengal, India on the north, Gomostapur, Nachole and Chapai Nawabganj Sadar Upazilas on the east, Chapai Nawabganj Sadar Upazila and Raghunathganj II CD Block in Murshidabad district, West Bengal,  on the south and Kaliachak III CD Block, Malda district, on the west.

Demographics

According to 2011 Bangladesh census, Shibganj had a population of 591,178. Males constituted 49.96% of the population and females 52.04%. Muslims formed 97.16% of the population, Hindus 2.82% and others 0.01%. Shibganj had a literacy rate of 47.94% for the population 7 years and above.

As of the 1991 Bangladesh census, Shibganj has a population of 422,347. Males constitute 51.25% of the population, and females 48.75%. This upazila's eighteen up population is 203,072. Shibganj has an average literacy rate of 21.1% (7+ years), and the national average of 32.4% literate.

Administration
Shibganj Upazila is divided into Shibganj Municipality and 15 union parishads: Binodpur, Chakkirti, Chhatrajitpur, Daipukuria, Dhainagar, Durlovpur, Ghorapakhia, Kansat, Mobarakpur, Monakasha, Noyalavanga, Panka, Shahbajpur, Shyampur, and Ujirpur. The union parishads are subdivided into 199 mauzas and 407 villages.

Shibganj Municipality is subdivided into 9 wards and 31 mahallas.

Chairman: SAYED NAZRUL ISLAM

Women Vice Chairman: Mrs. Shayema Begum

Vice Chairman: Shahidul Haqu Haidari

Upazila Nirbahi Officer (UNO): Irteza Hassan

Library
There is a library named Akimuddin Gronthagar at Jaminpur. It contains a philosophy 'knowledge is entry'. The library was established on 4 May 2008. Within a year it worked very good with the students of science. Akimudin Gronthagar arranged three camps to observe the century's only total Solar eclipse of July 22, 2009. It has more than 500 books and other tools and papers. It has a team led by Jahangir Alam Sur, science writer and enthusiast. The team arranges many program on science.

Notable people
 Khabeeruddin Ahmed, politician 
 Mainur Reza Choudhury, Chief Justice Supreme Court of Bangladesh
 Mohammad Yusuf Siddiq, historian, epigraphist, researcher, professor and author

References

External links
 

Upazilas of Chapai Nawabganj District